Sporting Club Abbeville Foot Côte Picarde is a French football club based in Abbeville, Picardie. It was founded in 1901. The club currently plays in the Régionale 2, Hauts-de-France, the seventh tier of the French football league system.

Honours
Champions Division 4 : 1979

Football clubs in France
Association football clubs established in 1901
1901 establishments in France
SC
Sport in Somme (department)
Football clubs in Hauts-de-France